Differential geometry of curves is the branch of geometry that deals with smooth curves in the plane and the Euclidean space by methods of differential and integral calculus.

Many specific curves have been thoroughly investigated using the synthetic approach. Differential geometry takes another path: curves are represented in a parametrized form, and their geometric properties and various quantities associated with them, such as the curvature and the arc length, are expressed via derivatives and integrals using vector calculus. One of the most important tools used to analyze a curve is the Frenet frame, a moving frame that provides a coordinate system at each point of the curve that is "best adapted" to the curve near that point.

The theory of curves is much simpler and narrower in scope than the theory of surfaces and its higher-dimensional generalizations because a regular curve in a Euclidean space has no intrinsic geometry. Any regular curve may be parametrized by the arc length (the natural parametrization). From the point of view of a theoretical point particle on the curve that does not know anything about the ambient space, all curves would appear the same. Different space curves are only distinguished by how they bend and twist. Quantitatively, this is measured by the differential-geometric invariants called the curvature and the torsion of a curve. The fundamental theorem of curves asserts that the knowledge of these invariants completely determines the curve.

Definitions 

A parametric -curve or a -parametrization is a vector-valued function 

The parametric curve  and its image  must be distinguished because a given subset of  can be the image of many distinct parametric curves. The parameter  in  can be thought of as representing time, and  the trajectory of a moving point in space. If the starting and the end points coincide (that is), then  is a closed curve or a loop.

The parametric curve is  if

is injective.

The curve  is regular of order  (where ) if, for every ,

In particular, a parametric -curve  is  if and only if  for any .

Re-parametrization and equivalence relation 

Given the image of a parametric curve, there are several different parametrizations of the parametric curve. Differential geometry aims to describe the properties of parametric curves that are invariant under certain reparametrizations. A suitable equivalence relation on the set of all parametric curves must be defined. The differential-geometric properties of a parametric curve (such as its length, its Frenet frame, and its generalized curvature) are invariant under reparametrization and therefore properties of the equivalence class itself. The equivalence classes are called -curves and are central objects studied in the differential geometry of curves.

and

Re-parametrization defines an equivalence relation on the set of all parametric -curves of class . The equivalence class of this relation simply a -curve.

An even finer equivalence relation of oriented parametric -curves can be defined by requiring  to satisfy .

Equivalent parametric -curves have the same image, and equivalent oriented parametric -curves even traverse the image in the same direction.

Length and natural parametrization

The length  of a parametric -curve  is defined as

The length of a parametric curve is invariant under reparametrization and is therefore a differential-geometric property of the parametric curve.

For each regular parametric -curve , where , the function is defined

In practice, it is often very difficult to calculate the natural parametrization of a parametric curve, but it is useful for theoretical arguments.

For a given parametric curve , the natural parametrization is unique up to a shift of parameter.

The quantity

Frenet frame 

A Frenet frame is a moving reference frame of  orthonormal vectors  which are used to describe a curve locally at each point . It is the main tool in the differential geometric treatment of curves because it is far easier and more natural to describe local properties (e.g. curvature, torsion) in terms of a local reference system than using a global one such as Euclidean coordinates.

called Frenet vectors. They are constructed from the derivatives of  using the Gram–Schmidt orthogonalization algorithm with

The real-valued functions  are called generalized curvatures and are defined as

The Frenet frame and the generalized curvatures are invariant under reparametrization and are therefore differential geometric properties of the curve.

Bertrand curve
We can write  for some constant .

Furthermore, the product of torsions of a Bertrand pair of curves is constant.
If  has more than one Bertrand mate then it has infinitely many. This only occurs when  is a circular helix.

Special Frenet vectors and generalized curvatures 

The first three Frenet vectors and generalized curvatures can be visualized in three-dimensional space. They have additional names and more semantic information attached to them.

Tangent vector 

Mathematically, given a parametrized  curve , for every value  of the parameter, the vector

 

is the tangent vector at the point . Generally speaking, the tangent vector may be zero. The tangent vector's magnitude

is the speed at the time .

The first Frenet vector  is the unit tangent vector in the same direction, defined at each regular point of :

If  is the natural parameter, then the tangent vector has unit length. The formula simplifies:

.

The unit tangent vector determines the orientation of the curve, or the forward direction, corresponding to the increasing values of the parameter. The unit tangent vector taken as a curve traces the spherical image of the original curve.

Normal vector or curvature vector 

A curve normal vector, sometimes called the curvature vector, indicates the deviance of the curve from being a straight line.
It is defined as

Its normalized form, the unit normal vector, is the second Frenet vector  and is defined as

The tangent and the normal vector at point  define the osculating plane at point .

It can be shown that . Therefore,

Curvature

It is defined as

It can be shown that

The reciprocal of the curvature

is called the radius of curvature.

A circle with radius  has a constant curvature of 

whereas a line has a curvature of 0.

Binormal vector 
The unit binormal vector is the third Frenet vector . It is defined as

In 3-dimensional space, the equation simplifies to

or to 

That either sign may occur is illustrated by the examples of a right-handed helix and a left-handed helix.

Torsion 

In other words, if the torsion is zero, the curve lies completely in the same osculating plane (there is only one osculating plane for every point ). It is defined as

Aberrancy 
The third derivative may be used to define aberrancy, a metric of non-circularity of a curve.

Main theorem of curve theory 

Given  functions:

then there exists a unique (up to transformations using the Euclidean group) -curve  which is regular of order n and has the following properties:

where the set

is the Frenet frame for the curve.

the Euclidean transformations are eliminated to obtain a unique curve .

Frenet–Serret formulas 

The Frenet–Serret formulas are a set of ordinary differential equations of first order. The solution is the set of Frenet vectors describing the curve specified by the generalized curvature functions .

2 dimensions

3 dimensions

dimensions (general formula)

See also
List of curves topics

References

Further reading
 Chapter II is a classical treatment of Theory of Curves in 3-dimensions.

Differential geometry
Curves